Lieutenant general Ahmad Amir-Ahmadi (1884–1965) was a military leader and cabinet Minister of Iran.

Born in 1884 in Isfahan, of an aristocratic Persian family, he is one of the planners of the coup d'état of Reza Pahlavi, Colonel Mohammad Taqi Pessian, his brother-in-law General Heydaygholi Pessian and Seyyed Zia'eddin Tabatabaee against the Qajar dynasty. He is the first person to receive the rank of "sepahbod" (corps general or lieutenant general) under Reza Shah Pahlavi. He and his brother-in-law Heydargholli Pessian had planned to create a more democratic Iran but he later told his sister that 'the British would not allow it'.

He served as Minister of War in the cabinet of Ali Soheili in 1942, and Abdolhosein Hazhir in 1948.  Following the departure of Reza Shah from Iran, Amir-Ahmadi became the minister of interior in Foroughi's cabinet, and then in Qavam-os-saltaneh and Soheili's cabinets he was the minister of war. Military governor of Tehran, commandant of the central garrison and the inspector of army were among his many responsibilities. After his retirement he entered the Senate as an appointed senator. He died of cancer in 1965.

He also served as Senator in the Majlis.

It was said he was the only man Reza Pahlavi truly respected and feared. His sister was married into the Pessian family, and after the assassination of Colonel Pessian, she arranged for his body to be hidden from Reza Pahlavi.

He played a leading role in the suppression of Luri revolts in 1920s and 1930s. The brutality reported at the time was later proved to be manufactured as had other reports of brutality.

See also
 Pahlavi Dynasty
 Amir Abdollah Tahmasebi
 Sar-Lashkar Muhammad-Hussein Ayrom
 Abdolhossein Teymourtash
 Sar Lashgar Buzarjomehri
 Mahmud Khan Puladeen
 Amanullah Jahanbani
 Colonel Pessian
 Bahram Aryana
 Iranian Art Museum Garden

References

'Alí Rizā Awsatí (عليرضا اوسطى), Iran in the Past Three Centuries (Irān dar Se Qarn-e Goz̲ashteh – ايران در سه قرن گذشته), Volumes 1 and 2 (Paktāb Publishing – انتشارات پاکتاب, Tehran, Iran, 2003).  (Vol. 1),  (Vol. 2).

1884 births
1965 deaths
Imperial Iranian Army lieutenant generals
Defence ministers of Iran
Members of the Senate of Iran
Politicians from Isfahan
20th-century Iranian military personnel
People of Qajar Iran
Military personnel from Isfahan